Watson's water hammer pulse, also known as Corrigan's pulse or collapsing pulse, is the medical sign (seen in aortic regurgitation) which describes a pulse that is bounding and forceful, rapidly increasing and subsequently collapsing, as if it were the sound of a water hammer that was causing the pulse.
A water hammer was a Victorian toy in which a tube was half filled with fluid, the remainder being a vacuum. Each time the tube was inverted or shaken, the impact of the fluid at each end would sound like a hammer blow.

This is associated with increased stroke volume of the left ventricle and decrease in the peripheral resistance leading to the widened pulse pressure of aortic regurgitation.

Diagnosis
To feel a water hammer pulse: with the patient reclining, the examiner raises the patient's arm vertically upwards. The examiner grasps the muscular part of the patient's forearm. A water hammer pulse is felt as a tapping impulse that is transmitted through the bulk of the muscles. This happens because the blood that is pumped to the arm during systole is emptied very quickly due to the gravity effect on the raised arm. This results in the artery emptying back into the heart during diastole, increasing preload, and therefore increasing cardiac output, (as per the Frank–Starling mechanism) so that systolic blood pressure increases and a stronger pulse pressure can be palpated.

Causes
Water hammer pulse is commonly found when a patient has aortic regurgitation. It can also be seen in other conditions which are associated with a hyperdynamic circulation. A more comprehensive list of causes follows:
 Physiological
 Fever
 Pregnancy
 Cardiac lesions
 Aortic regurgitation
 Patent ductus arteriosus
 Systolic hypertension
 Bradycardia
 Aortopulmonary window
 Aneurysm of sinus of Valsalva
 Syndromes or high-output states
 Anemia
 Cor pulmonale
 Cirrhosis of liver
 Beriberi
 Thyrotoxicosis
 Arteriovenous fistula
 Paget's disease
 Other causes
 Chronic alcoholism

Eponym

"Watson's water hammer pulse" and "Corrigan's pulse" refer to similar observations. However, the former usually refers to measurement of a pulse on a limb, while the latter refers to measurement of the pulse of the carotid artery.
 "Corrigan's pulse" is named for Sir Dominic Corrigan, the Irish physician, who characterized it in 1832.
 "Watson's water hammer pulse" is named for Thomas Watson, who characterized it in 1844.

See also
 Blood hammer

References

Symptoms and signs: Cardiac